Cruceni may refer to several villages in Romania:

 Cruceni, a village in Șagu Commune, Arad County
 Cruceni, a village in Foeni Commune, Timiș County